Budapesti Postás SE is a Hungarian football club from the town of Zugló, Budapest.

History
Budapesti Postás SE debuted in the 1903 season of the Hungarian League and finished fourth.

Name Changes
1899–1901: Budapesti Posta és Távirda Tisztviselők Sport Egyesülete
1901–1917: Postások Sport Egyesülete
1906: football department was dissolved
1908: football department was founded again
1917–1918: Postás Sport Egyesület
1918–1919: Postások Sport Clubja
1919–1950: Postás Sport Egyesület
1950: merger with Szentlőrinci AC
1950–1954: Budapesti Postás SK
1954: Budapesti Törekvés SE (merger with BKV Előre SC and Budapesti Lokomotív)
1956: divided into Postás SE, BKV Előre SC, BVSC Budapest and Szentlőrinci AC
1956–present: Postás SE

Managers
 Lajos Baróti (1952–53)

References

External links
 Profile

Football clubs in Budapest
1899 establishments in Hungary